Sheila Terry (born 7 June 1950) is an Irish Fine Gael Party politician who served as a member of the 22nd Seanad Éireann.

As a member of the Progressive Democrats (PDs), Terry was elected at the 1991 local elections as a PD member of Fingal County Council for the Castleknock electoral area. She stood as a PD candidate in the Dublin West constituency at the 1992 general election and at the by-election in 1996.

She left the Progressive Democrats before the 1999 local elections, when she was re-elected to the council as an independent, and joined Fine Gael in about 2000.  She then stood as a Fine Gael for Dáil Éireann in the Dublin West constituency at the 2002 general election, but did not win a seat. However, in the subsequent Seanad elections she was elected by the Industrial and Commercial Panel.

She gave up her council seat when the dual mandate was abolished in 2003 (future Taoiseach Leo Varadkar was co-opted to replace her on the council), and did not contest the 2007 general election. She stood again in the 2007 Seanad election, but lost her seat.

References

1950 births
Living people
Progressive Democrats politicians
Fine Gael senators
Members of the 22nd Seanad
21st-century women members of Seanad Éireann
Councillors of Dublin County Council
Local councillors in Fingal
Politicians from Fingal